The Web of Science (WoS; previously known as Web of Knowledge) is a paid-access platform that provides (typically via the internet) access to multiple databases that provide reference and citation data from academic journals, conference proceedings, and other documents in various academic disciplines. It was originally produced by the Institute for Scientific Information.It is currently owned by Clarivate (previously the Intellectual Property and Science business of Thomson Reuters).

Background and history
A citation index is built on the fact that citations in science serve as linkages between similar research items, and lead to matching or related scientific literature, such as journal articles, conference proceedings, abstracts, etc. In addition, literature that shows the greatest impact in a particular field, or more than one discipline, can be easily located through a citation index. For example, a paper's influence can be determined by linking to all the papers that have cited it. In this way, current trends, patterns, and emerging fields of research can be assessed. Eugene Garfield, the "father of citation indexing of academic literature," who launched the Science Citation Index, which in turn led to the Web of Science, wrote:

Search answer
Web of Science is described as a unifying research tool that enables the user to acquire, analyze, and disseminate database information in a timely manner. This is accomplished because of the creation of a common vocabulary, called ontology, for varied search terms and varied data. Moreover, search terms generate related information across categories.

Acceptable content for Web of Science is determined by an evaluation and selection process based on the following criteria: impact, influence, timeliness, peer review, and geographic representation.

Web of Science employs various search and analysis capabilities. First, citation indexing is employed, which is enhanced by the capability to search for results across disciplines. The influence, impact, history, and methodology of an idea can be followed from its first instance, notice, or referral to the present day. This technology points to a deficiency with the keyword-only method of searching.

Second, subtle trends and patterns relevant to the literature or research of interest, become apparent. Broad trends indicate significant topics of the day, as well as the history relevant to both the work at hand, and particular areas of study.

Third, trends can be graphically represented.

Coverage

Expanding the coverage of Web of Science, in November 2009 Thomson Reuters introduced Century of Social Sciences. This service contains files which trace social science research back to the beginning of the 20th century, and Web of Science now has indexing coverage from the year 1900 to the present. , the  multidisciplinary coverage of the Web of Science encompasses 12,000 high impact journals and 160,000 conference proceedings. The selection is made on the basis of impact evaluations and comprise academic journals, spanning multiple academic disciplines. The coverage includes: the sciences, social sciences, the arts, and humanities, and goes across disciplines. However, Web of Science does not index all journals.

There is a significant and positive correlation between the impact factor and CiteScore. However, an analysis by Elsevier, who created the journal evaluation metric CiteScore, has identified 216 journals from 70 publishers to be in the top 10 percent of the most-cited journals in their subject category based on the CiteScore while they did not have an impact factor. It appears that the impact factor does not provide comprehensive and unbiased coverage of high-quality journals. Similar results can be observed by comparing the impact factor with the SCImago Journal Rank.

Furthermore, as of September 3, 2014 the total file count of the Web of Science was 90 million records, which included over a billion cited references. This citation service on average indexes around 65 million items per year, and it is described as the largest accessible citation database.

Titles of foreign-language publications are translated into English and so cannot be found by searches in the original language.

In 2018, the Web of Science started embedding partial information about the open access status of works, using Unpaywall data.

After the 2022 Russian invasion of Ukraine, on March 11, 2022, Clarivate – which owns Web of Science – announced that it would cease all commercial activity in Russia and immediately close an office there.

Citation databases

The Web of Science Core Collection consists of six online indexing databases:
Science Citation Index Expanded (SCIE) -previously entitled Science Citation Index- covers more than 9,200 journals across 178 scientific disciplines. Coverage is from 1900 to present day, with over 53 million records
Social Sciences Citation Index (SSCI) covers more than 3,400 journals in the social sciences. Coverage is from 1900 to present, with over 9.3 million records
Arts & Humanities Citation Index (AHCI) covers more than 1,800 journals in the arts and humanities. Coverage is from 1975 to present, with over 4.9 million records 
Emerging Sources Citation Index (ESCI) covers more than 7,800 journals in all disciplines. Coverage is from 2005 to present, with over 3 million records
Book Citation Index (BCI) covers more than 116,000 editorially selected books. Coverage is from 2005 to present, with over 53.2 million records
Conference Proceedings Citation Index (CPCI) covers more than 205,000 conference proceedings. Coverage is from 1990 to present, with over 70.1 million records

Regional databases
Since 2008, the Web of Science hosts a number of regional citation indices: 
Chinese Science Citation Database, produced in partnership with the Chinese Academy of Sciences, was the first indexing database in a language other than English
SciELO Citation Index, established in 2013, covering Brazil, Spain, Portugal, the Caribbean and South Africa, and an additional 12 countries of Latin America
Korea Citation Index in 2014, with updates from the National Research Foundation of Korea
 Russian Science Citation Index in 2015
 Arabic Regional Citation Index in 2020

Contents
The seven citation indices listed above contain references which have been cited by other articles. One may use them to undertake cited reference search, that is, locating articles that cite an earlier, or current publication. One may search citation databases by topic, by author, by source title, and by location. Two chemistry databases,  Index Chemicus and  Current Chemical Reactions allow for the creation of structure drawings, thus enabling users to locate chemical compounds and reactions.

Abstracting and indexing
The following  types of literature are indexed: scholarly books, peer reviewed journals, original research articles, reviews, editorials, chronologies, abstracts, as well as other items. Disciplines included in this index are  agriculture, biological sciences, engineering, medical and life sciences, physical and chemical sciences, anthropology, law, library sciences, architecture, dance, music, film, and theater. Seven citation databases encompasses coverage of the above disciplines.

Other databases and products
Among other WoS databases are BIOSIS and The Zoological Record, an electronic index of zoological literature that also serves as the unofficial register of scientific names in zoology.

Web of Science includes other products providing data, analytics, insights, workflow tools, and professional services to researchers, universities, research institutions, governments, private and public research funding organizations, publishers, and research-intensive corporations.

 InCites
 Journal Citation Reports
 Essential Science Indicators
 ScholarOne
 Converis

Limitations in the use of citation analysis

As with other scientific approaches, scientometrics and bibliometrics have their own limitations. In 2010, a criticism was voiced pointing toward certain deficiencies of the journal impact factor calculation process, based on Thomson Reuters Web of Science, such as: journal citation distributions usually are highly skewed towards established journals; journal impact factor properties are field-specific and can be easily manipulated by editors, or even by changing the editorial policies; this makes the entire process essentially non-transparent.

Regarding the more objective journal metrics, there is a growing view that for greater accuracy it must be supplemented with article-level metrics and peer-review. Studies of methodological quality and reliability have found that "reliability of published research works in several fields may be decreasing with increasing journal rank". Thomson Reuters replied to criticism in general terms by stating that "no one metric can fully capture the complex contributions scholars make to their disciplines, and many forms of scholarly achievement should be considered."

Journal Citation Reports

See also

arXiv
CiteSeerX
CSA databases
Dialog (online database)
Energy Citations Database
Energy Science and Technology Database
ETDEWEB
Google Scholar
h-index
Indian Citation Index
J-Gate
List of academic journal search engines
Materials Science Citation Index
PASCAL database
PubMed Central
Répertoire International de Littérature Musicale
ResearchGate
Serbian Citation Index
VINITI Database RAS

References

External links
 

Bibliographic databases and indexes
Online databases
Clarivate